The 2023 WNBA season will be the 16th season for the Atlanta Dream of the Women's National Basketball Association, and their second season under head coach Tanisha Wright.

The Dream secured the third overall pick in the 2023 WNBA Draft in the 2023 Draft Lottery. They entered the lottery with the 2nd best odds to get the first overall pick.

Former Assistant Coach Christie Sides from the 2022 season left the team in the offseason after she was named the new head coach of the Indiana Fever.

Transactions

WNBA Draft

Transactions

Roster Changes

Additions

Subtractions

Roster

Schedule

Regular Season

|- 
| 1
| May 20
| @ Dallas
| 
| 
| 
| 
| College Park Center
| 
|- 
| 2
| May 23
| @ Minnesota
| 
| 
| 
| 
| Target Center
| 
|- 
| 3
| May 28
| Indiana
| 
| 
| 
| 
| Gateway Center Arena
| 
|- 
| 4
| May 30
| Chicago
| 
| 
| 
| 
| Gateway Center Arena
| 

|- 
| 5
| June 2
| Las Vegas
| 
| 
| 
| 
| Gateway Center Arena
| 
|- 
| 6
| June 9
| New York
| 
| 
| 
| 
| Gateway Center Arena
| 
|- 
| 7
| June 11
| Connecticut
| 
| 
| 
| 
| Gateway Center Arena
| 
|- 
| 8
| June 13
| @ New York
| 
| 
| 
| 
| Barclays Center
| 
|- 
| 9
| June 15
| @ Connecticut
| 
| 
| 
| 
| Mohegan Sun Arena
| 
|- 
| 10
| June 18
| @ Indiana
| 
| 
| 
| 
| Gainbridge Fieldhouse
| 
|- 
| 11
| June 20
| @ Dallas
| 
| 
| 
| 
| College Park Center
| 
|- 
| 12
| June 23
| New York
| 
| 
| 
| 
| Gateway Center Arena
| 
|- 
| 13
| June 28
| @ Washington
| 
| 
| 
| 
| Entertainment and Sports Arena
|
|- 
| 14
| June 30
| Washington
| 
| 
| 
| 
| Gateway Center Arena
| 

|- 
| 15
| July 2
| Los Angeles
| 
| 
| 
| 
| Gateway Center Arena
| 
|- 
| 16
| July 5
| @ Los Angeles
| 
| 
| 
| 
| Crypto.com Arena
| 
|- 
| 17
| July 7
| @ Chicago
| 
| 
| 
| 
| Wintrust Arena
|
|- 
| 18
| July 9
| @ Chicago
| 
| 
| 
| 
| Wintrust Arena
| 
|- 
| 19
| July 12
| Seattle
| 
| 
| 
| 
| Gateway Center Arena
|
|- 
| 20
| July 18
| Minnesota
| 
| 
| 
| 
| Gateway Center Arena
|
|- 
| 21
| July 20
| @ Connecticut
| 
| 
| 
| 
| Mohegan Sun Arena
|
|- 
| 22
| July 22
| Connecticut
| 
| 
| 
| 
| Gateway Center Arena
|
|- 
| 23
| July 25
| Phoenix
| 
| 
| 
| 
| Gateway Center Arena
|
|- 
| 24
| July 27
| @ New York
| 
| 
| 
| 
| Barclays Center
|
|- 
| 25
| July 30
| Washington
| 
| 
| 
| 
| Gateway Center Arena
|

|- 
| 26
| August 1
| @ Las Vegas
| 
| 
| 
| 
| Michelob Ultra Arena
|
|- 
| 27
| August 3
| @ Phoenix
| 
| 
| 
| 
| Footprint Center
|
|- 
| 28
| August 6
| Indiana
| 
| 
| 
| 
| Gateway Center Arena
|
|- 
| 29
| August 10
| @ Seattle
| 
| 
| 
| 
| Climate Pledge Arena
|
|- 
| 30
| August 12
| @ Los Angeles
| 
| 
| 
| 
| Crypto.com Arena
|
|- 
| 31
| August 13
| @ Las Vegas
| 
| 
| 
| 
| Michelob Ultra Arena
|
|- 
| 32
| August 18
| Chicago
| 
| 
| 
| 
| Gateway Center Arena
|
|- 
| 33
| August 22
| Las Vegas
| 
| 
| 
| 
| Gateway Center Arena
|
|- 
| 34
| August 25
| Los Angeles
| 
| 
| 
| 
| Gateway Center Arena
|
|- 
| 35
| August 27
| @ Indiana
| 
| 
| 
| 
| Gainbridge Fieldhouse
|
|- 
| 36
| August 29
| Phoenix
| 
| 
| 
| 
| Gateway Center Arena
|

|- 
| 37
| September 1
| @ Minnesota
| 
| 
| 
| 
| Target Center
|
|- 
| 38
| September 6
| Seattle
| 
| 
| 
| 
| Target Center
|
|- 
| 39
| September 8
| @ Washington
| 
| 
| 
| 
| Entertainment and Sports Arena
|
|- 
| 40
| September 10
| Dallas
| 
| 
| 
| 
| Gateway Center Arena
|
|-

Standings

Statistics

Regular Season

Awards and Honors

References

External links
The Official Site of the Atlanta Dream

Atlanta Dream seasons
Atlanta
Atlanta Dream